Min kone er uskyldig (My Wife is Innocent) is a 1950 Danish comedy film directed by Johan Jacobsen and starring Poul Reichhardt.

Cast
Poul Reichhardt as Architect Frederik Lund / Claus Lund
Bodil Kjer as Betty Lund
Gunnar Lauring as Landsretssagfører Herbert Thomsen
Vera Gebuhr as Maid at Lund
Louis Miehe-Renard as Tank attendant
Preben Mahrt as Lise Born's fiancé
Svend Bille as Director
Knud Heglund as Director
Henry Nielsen as Man looking for apartment
Ejner Federspiel as Man looking for apartment
Karin Nellemose as Lise Born
Helga Frier as Passenger on a train
Carl Struve as Guest at hotel in Norway
Sossen Krohg as Guest at hotel in Norway
Aage Winther-Jørgensen as Detective
Nils Reinhardt Christensen
Bjarne Forchhammer

External links

1950 films
1950 comedy films
Danish black-and-white films
Films directed by Johan Jacobsen
Danish comedy films
1950s Danish-language films